Hip Soul is a studio album by organist Shirley Scott recorded in 1961 for Prestige and released the same year as PRLP 7205.

Track listing 
"Hip Soul" (Turrentine) - 6:31
"411 West" (Golson) - 6:33
"By Myself" (Dietz, Schwartz) - 5:59
"Trane's Blues" (Coltrane) - 4:56
"Stanley's Time" (Turrentine) - 4:22
"Out of This World" (Arlen, Mercer) - 11:18

Personnel 
 Shirley Scott - organ
 Stanley Turrentine (as Stan Turner) - tenor sax
 Herbie Lewis - bass
 Roy Brooks - drums

References 

1961 albums
Albums produced by Esmond Edwards
Albums recorded at Van Gelder Studio
Prestige Records albums
Shirley Scott albums